Boston Charley (1854 – October 3, 1873) was an Indian warrior in the Modoc War of 1872. He was reportedly given the "Boston" moniker by miners who felt he had a lighter complexion than the other warriors. In 1873 he had joined the group led by Kintpuash, and was later involved in a massacre that killed fourteen people at Tule Lake. On April 11, 1873 he was part of a group that murdered Edward Canby. Charley did not personally kill Canby, but during the raid he killed a Dr. Thomas. On October 3, 1873, Boston Charley, Kintpuash, Schonchin John and Black Jim were executed for the murder of Edward Canby. He reportedly met his execution stoically, asking only for tobacco.

See also 
Death of Edward Canby

References

General references

Modoc people
People of the Modoc War
1854 births
1873 deaths
19th-century executions by the United States
Executed Native American people
People executed for murder
1873 murders in the United States
19th-century Native Americans